The X Factor was an Australian television reality music competition, based on the original British version, to find new singing talent; the winner of which received a Sony Music Australia recording contract. The eighth season, branded as X Factor: Next Generation, premiered on Seven Network on 3 October 2016. Jason Dundas replaced Luke Jacobz as host; with the judging panel consisting of Mel B, Guy Sebastian, Iggy Azalea and Adam Lambert. The winner was Isaiah Firebrace and his winner's single "It's Gotta Be You" was released after the final. He was mentored by Lambert, who won as mentor for the first and only time.

Judges and host

In February 2016, reports claimed that Seven Network was mulling over whether or not to delay the series' planned season 8 until 2017. It was later confirmed that The X Factor would return in 2016.

Dannii Minogue reported that she would not be returning to the programme after three series on the judging panel. On 12 June 2016, Iggy Azalea was announced as Chris Isaak's replacement, with Guy Sebastian. The following day, Adam Lambert was confirmed to be the third judge for season 8 replacing James Blunt. On 11 October 2016, shortly before the three-seat challenge, former judge Mel B was announced as the "underdog judge" also to replace Minogue, after months of rumours, whereby three acts who failed to secure a seat in this challenge can be recruited by her for inclusion in the "underdogs" category.

On 24 November 2015, Luke Jacobz announced on his Twitter account that he would not be returning as the host for the eighth season in 2016. On 25 June 2016, Jason Dundas was announced as Jacobz's replacement.

Selection process
Open auditions in front of the show's producers took place in 17 cities and ran from 18 April to 21 May 2016.

Auditions

Open auditions
Open auditions began on 18 April in Geelong and concluded on 21 May 2016 in Melbourne.

Judges' auditions
Judges' auditions took at Sydney Olympic Park from 29 June to 1 July and again from 5 to 6 July 2016.

Bootcamp
Bootcamp was briefly shown during the last audition episode, where the judges found out which category they would mentor. Once the judges found out their categories, they had each of their acts sing acapella for their judge and once everyone sang, the category judge narrowed their category down to 12 acts who would move on to the Three Chair Challenge.

Three seat challenge
The three seat challenge round of the competition was held at the Sydney Olympic Park between 28 and 29 July 2016. This will be a replacement as the super home visits used in previous seasons. Three acts who were not successful were recruited by underdog judge Mel B.

Key:
 – Act was immediately eliminated after performance without given a seat
 – Act was given a seat but swapped out later in the competition and eventually eliminated
 – Act was given a seat and made the final three of their own category
 – Act did not make the final three of their own category but was later saved by Mel B

Acts

Key:
 – Winner
 – Runner-Up

*AYA (originally named Chai) was previously known as Montage. Their name was changed a second time after the three-seat challenge.

Live shows
The live shows began airing on 23 October 2016. Initially, ten live shows were planned, but they had to be cut down to five, apparently due to the scheduling conflicts. Guy Sebastian mentored the Over 22s, Iggy Azalea mentored the Groups and Adam Lambert mentored the 14-21s. Mel B was announced as the mentor of the Underdogs category, where she chose three acts who were eliminated in the three-seat challenge, join her category; the contestants of this category were not revealed until the first live show. The live shows concluded on 21 November 2016, where this would be the final episode of The X Factor to be aired, as the programme had to be cancelled in January 2017 due to the declining ratings.

Results summary
Colour key
 Act in Team Mel B
 Act in Team Guy
 Act in Team Iggy
 Act in Team Adam

  – Act in the bottom two and had to perform again in the final showdown
  – Act was in the bottom three but received the fewest votes and was immediately eliminated
  – Act received the fewest public votes and was immediately eliminated (no final showdown)

Notes
1 In week 1, one act from each category was eliminated, hence each category was ranked individually.
2 Mel B was not required to vote as there was already a Majority.

Live show details

Week 1 (23/24 October)
 Theme: Judges' Choice (Free Choice)
 Group performance: "Battle Scars"/"Fancy"/"Whataya Want from Me"/"Wannabe"
 Celebrity performers: Jessica Mauboy ("Flame Trees") and Zara Larsson ("Ain't My Fault")

One act from each category was eliminated from the competition after the first show, as voted by viewers

Week 2 (30/31 October) 
 Theme: Judges' Makeovers (Free Choice)
 Group performance: "Money Maker" with Throttle, LunchMoney Lewis and Aston Merrygold
 Celebrity performers: Adam Lambert ("Evil In The Night") and Shawn Mendes ("Mercy")

Judges' vote to eliminate
 Mel B: AYA – backed her own act, Beatz.
 Azalea: Beatz – backed her own act, AYA.
 Lambert: Beatz – said AYA had stronger vocals.
 Sebastian: AYA – could not decide and sent the result to deadlock.

With the acts in the bottom two receiving two votes each, the result went to deadlock and reverted to the earlier public vote. AYA were eliminated as the act with the fewest public votes.

Week 3: Quarter-Final (6/7 November) 
 Theme: Viewers' Choice
 Guest mentors: Dami Im, Jess & Matt, Samantha Jade, Jai Waetford, Cyrus and Taylor Henderson
 Group performance: "Sound of Silence"
 Celebrity performers: Dami Im ("Fighting for Love"), Guy Sebastian ("Set in Stone"), Disturbed ("The Sound of Silence")

The viewers were given the power to choose this week's songs.

Dundas confirmed during Sunday's live show that this week would be a double elimination.

Judges' vote to eliminate
 Sebastian: Beatz – backed his own act, Chynna Taylor.
 Mel B: Chynna Taylor – backed her own act, Beatz.
 Azalea: Chynna Taylor – wanted a group to stay in the competition.
 Lambert: Beatz – could not decide and sent the result to deadlock.

With the acts in the bottom two receiving two votes each, the result went to deadlock and reverted to the earlier public vote. Chynna Taylor was eliminated as the act with the fewest public votes.

Week 4: Semi-Final (13/14 November) 
 Theme: Killer Tracks & Curveballs
 Group performance: "Wings" 
 Celebrity performers: Little Mix ("Shout Out to My Ex"), Samantha Jade & Cyrus Villanueva ("Hurt Anymore") and The Veronicas ("On Your Side")

For the first time this season, the contestants will sing two songs each.

Judges' vote to send through
 Lambert: Vlado – went with his gut.
 Azalea: Vlado – has said multiple times Vlado was her favourite in the competition.
 Sebastian: Vlado – also trusted his gut feeling.
 Mel B was not required to vote as there was already a majority and did not say how she would have voted as both acts were in her category.

Week 5: Final (20/21 November) 
20 November
 Theme: Showstoppers & Duets  
 Celebrity performer: James Arthur ("Safe Inside")

21 November
 Theme: Winner's Songs
 Group performances:
 "Final Song" (Top 12)
 "Heroes (We Could Be)" (Top 12)
 Celebrity performers: Charli XCX ("After the Afterparty"), Tove Lo ("Cool Girl"), Tori Kelly ("Don't You Worry 'Bout a Thing") and Robbie Williams ("Love My Life")

Reception

Ratings
Ratings data is from OzTAM and represents the average viewership from the 5 largest Australian metropolitan centres (Sydney, Melbourne, Brisbane, Perth and Adelaide).

References

2016 Australian television seasons
Australia 08
Season 8
2016 in Australian music